Sabato Morais (April 13, 1823 – November 11, 1897) was an Italian-American rabbi, leader of Mikveh Israel Synagogue in Philadelphia, pioneer of Italian Jewish Studies in America, and founder of the Jewish Theological Seminary, which initially acted as a center of education for Orthodox Rabbis.

Early years 
Morais was born in Livorno, Italy. He was the elder son and the third of nine children of Samuel and Bona Morais. The Morais family came originally from Portugal, being probably among the large number of Jews who fled thence from the Inquisition. At the time of Sabato's birth, Italy was in the thick of her great struggle for freedom. Samuel Morais was an ardent republican, at one time undergoing imprisonment for his political views, and his father, Sabato Morais, was prominently identified with the political movements of his day.

Upon young Sabato early rested the responsibility of aiding in the support of the family. While still a child he earned a little by teaching Hebrew hymns and prayers to other children, meantime pursuing his own studies under Rabbis Funaro, Curiat, and others, and then under his Hebrew master, Rabbi Abraham Baruch Piperno, and gaining honorable mention in belles-lettres under Prof. Salvatore de Benedetti. In addition to Hebrew and Italian, he acquired familiarity with Aramaic, French, and Spanish.

He remained at his home studying and teaching until 1845, when he went to London to apply for the vacant post of assistant hazzan of the Spanish and Portuguese congregation in that city. (The position of "hazzan", literally "cantor", in the context of 19th-century American Judaism was generally equivalent to the contemporary position of "rabbi"). Owing to his unfamiliarity with English he was unsuccessful and returned to his home, but in the following year (1846) he accepted an invitation to become Hebrew master of the Orphans' School of the same congregation. Here he remained five years, meantime perfecting himself in English. During this period he formed a close friendship with Joseph Mazzini, and that patriot's struggle for Italian freedom was warmly seconded by Morais.

Elected hazzan in Philadelphia 
In 1850, owing to the withdrawal of Isaac Leeser, the pulpit of the Mikveh Israel Synagogue congregation at Philadelphia, became vacant, and Morais was an applicant for the post. He arrived in Philadelphia on March 17, 1851, and was elected April 13 following, the synagogue services in the interval being conducted by him. In 1855 he married Clara Esther Weil, who died in 1872, leaving seven children. From the date of his installation as hazzan until his death his influence was a continually growing power for traditional (Orthodox) Judaism. The synagogue formerly (c.1906) occupied by the Mikveh Israel congregation was built and consecrated during his incumbency.

Though his ministry covered the period of greatest activity in the adaptation of Judaism in America to changed conditions, he, as the advocate of Orthodox Judaism, withstood every appeal in behalf of ritualistic innovations and departures from traditional practice, winning the esteem of his opponents by his consistency and integrity. His sermons covered a wide scope of thought and action, and he showed the loftiness of his spirit when, in spite of congregational opposition to the expression of his views during the American Civil War, he continued, both in prayer and in his discourses, to show his warm sympathy with the cause of the slave. In appreciation of his attitude during these trying times the Union League Club of Philadelphia placed him on the roll of its honorary members.

Aids in founding the Theological Seminary 
When, in 1867, Maimonides College was established in Philadelphia, Morais was made professor of the Bible and of Biblical literature, and he held the chair during the six years that the college existed. For a number of years thereafter he felt the urgent need of an institution for the training of Jewish ministers on historical and traditional lines, and the declarations of the Pittsburg Conference in 1885 urged him to immediate action. After a considerable agitation of the subject he succeeded, in conjunction with a few others, in establishing (January, 1886) the Jewish Theological Seminary at New York.

He was at once made president of the faculty and professor of Bible, holding both posts until his death. Unquestionably the establishment of the seminary constitutes Morais' most lasting influence upon Judaism in America. The directors of that body have fittingly recognized his memory by naming the chair of Biblical literature and exegesis "the Sabato Morais professorship." In 1887 the University of Pennsylvania conferred upon him the honorary degree of Doctor of Laws, he being the first Jew so honored by that institution. Many of his papers are evidently held in that institution's library.

His multifarious activity 
In addition to the work which he did in official positions, Morais was most active in religious, educational, and charity matters. The Hebrew Sunday-School Society, the Hebrew Education Society of Philadelphia, and the Young Men's Hebrew Association of that city numbered him among their most steadfast friends. In his own home he gathered about him a small band of young men whom he instructed in Hebrew, Talmud, and Jewish history, and in whom he inspired a zealous love for Judaism which has had a very marked effect upon the character not only of his pupils (among them Isaac Husik), but of the community at large.  Among his children, Henry Samuel Morais was also a well-known communal rabbi, serving at several different congregations in Mikve Israel and other congregations in New York and Rhode Island.

The strong conservatism of the Jews of Philadelphia and the warm interest in the higher things of Judaism evinced by the younger men of that city may be in a large measure directly traced to the influence of Sabato Morais. He was greatly interested in the Alliance Israélite Universelle, and was in constant correspondence with rabbis and scholars in Europe and the Orient. Through his friend Chevalier Emanuel Felice Veneziani, the almoner of Baron de Hirsch, he was enabled to secure timely aid for the agricultural colonies in New Jersey and was the representative of Baron de Hirsch in the Carmel Colony.

When the Russo-Jewish exodus began, in 1882, and Russian Jews in large numbers settled in Philadelphia, Morais immediately became their friend. Although unable to speak their language, his perfect familiarity with Hebrew as a living tongue gave him a ready means of communication. Among Gentiles also he was widely known and esteemed, and was very frequently called upon to address public assemblies.

Besides his sermons, he contributed to Jewish literature much in the form of addresses to various Jewish organizations and of theological, polemical, literary, and critical articles for the Jewish press at home and abroad. He wrote classic Hebrew in prose and in verse with ease and elegance.

In all his life, Morais maintained close (cultural, religious and political) ties with his motherland, Italy. His translations and essays in Italian Jewry made him the founding father of Italian Jewish Studies in America.

Among his later works are:
 A translation of the Prolegomena to a Grammar of the Hebrew Language, by S. D. Luzzatto (in Fifth Biennial Report of the Jewish Theological Seminary)
 An Essay on the Jew in Italy (in Second Biennial Report of the same)
 Italian Jewish Literature (in Publications of Gratz College, 1897)
 His translation of the Book of Jeremiah for the Bible of the Jewish Publication Society of America was completed shortly before his death, which occurred in Philadelphia on November 11, 1897.

Morias is interred in the Mikveh Israel Cemetery (11th and Federal).

Bibliography 

The JE article cites the following works:
 H.S. Morais, The Jews of Philadelphia, Philadelphia, 1894;
 Memoir by H. S. Morais in Sixth Biennial Report of the Jewish Theological Seminary Association, New York, 1896.

Further reading

External links 
 Jewish Encyclopedia article on SABATO MORAIS

1823 births
1897 deaths
Livornese Jews
19th-century Italian rabbis
American people of Portuguese-Jewish descent
American Sephardic Jews
American Orthodox rabbis
Italian Orthodox rabbis
Hazzans
Italian emigrants to the United States
19th-century Italian singers
19th-century American rabbis